The 2002 Scottish Claymores season was the eighth season for the franchise in the NFL Europe League (NFLEL). The team was led by head coach Gene Dahlquist in his second year, and played four of its home games at Hampden Park in Glasgow and one at Murrayfield Stadium in Edinburgh, Scotland. They finished the regular season in fourth place with a record of five wins and five losses.

Offseason

Free agent draft

Personnel

Staff

Roster

Schedule

Standings

Notes

References

Scotland
Scottish Claymores seasons